Albuquerque Sol FC is an American soccer club based in Albuquerque, New Mexico.  Co-founded by Ron Patel and Larry Espinoza in 2013, the team plays in USL League Two, the fourth tier of the American soccer pyramid.

History

Inaugural season (2014) 
On May 3, 2014, Albuquerque Sol F.C. opened its season on the road against the Las Vegas Mobsters in Las Vegas, Nevada. The Sol lost its first ever game 1–0. The following week, they traveled to Highlands Ranch, Colorado for a two-match series against the Real Colorado Foxes.  The first match resulted in a scoreless draw, but the second match featured the Sol's first ever goal (a tally from Ricardo Perez in the 60th minute) and first ever win, a 2–1 victory over the Foxes on Saturday, May 10. The Sol opened their home slate at Ben Rios Field on May 24, 2014 against the Midland/Odessa Sockers, a 1–2 loss before a crowd of 1,318.
The 2014 edition of the Sol were competitive, obtaining a result in nine of their fourteen matches, but they were only able to secure 15 points and finished outside the USL PDL Mountain Division playoffs.

Early years (2015–2018) 
On July 18, 2015, Albuquerque Sol F.C. played its first playoff game against FC Tucson at the Kino Sports Complex in Tucson, Arizona. The Sol lost that game 2–1.

Post-Ron Patel era (2018–present) 
On April 19, 2018, Ron Patel stepped down from Albuquerque Sol F.C. to pursue another in-state project. Co-founder and general manager Espinoza announced that he would double as President in an interim capacity with anticipation that a new full-time club manager would be filled by the end of the 2018 season.

Year-by-year

Club culture

Supporters
Albuquerque Sol FC's official supporters group is the Sol Mates. In addition to the Sol Mates, there is an unofficial supporters group, the Sandianistas, which formed shortly after the club's inception in late 2013. The supporters sit in the west end of Ben Rios Field for all home matches.

Rivalries
The Sol compete with FC Tucson in the Southwestern Showdown, an annual series for the right to hold the "Golden Rattler" trophy for the following year. Albuquerque has also competed with FC Tucson and Las Vegas Mobsters for the Copa Frontera, a supporter-created trophy for clubs in the PDL Mountain Division with active supporter cultures.

Current roster
As of May 5, 2018

Retired numbers

4 –  Patrick Grange (Forward)
At halftime of the Sol's home finale on July 12, 2014, the club retired its No. 4 jersey in commemoration of Grange's impact on local soccer as well as to raise awareness for ALS (amyotrophic lateral sclerosis), the disease which claimed Grange's life in 2012.

Head coaches
  Chris Cartlidge (2014)
  Matt Gordon (2015–2017)
  Justin Sells (2018–present)

References

External links
 

 
Soccer clubs in New Mexico
USL League Two teams
Association football clubs established in 2013
2013 establishments in New Mexico